Coandă may refer to:

Constantin Coandă, Romanian Army general, Prime Minister of Romania during World War I.
Henri Coandă, Constantin's son, aircraft designer and inventor.
The Coandă effect, a phenomenon that causes a fluid to be attracted to another object, named after Henri Coandă.

Romanian-language surnames